Dynamine racidula, the racidula sailor, is a species of butterfly of the family Nymphalidae. It is found in Brazil and Venezuela.

Subspecies
Dynamine racidula racidula (Brazil: Amazonas)
Dynamine racidula trembathi Neild, 1996 (Venezuela)

References

Butterflies described in 1852
Biblidinae
Fauna of Brazil
Nymphalidae of South America